Francis An Shuxin (born 16 July 1949) is the Roman Catholic bishop of the diocese of Baoding, China. He received consecration by Bishop Peter Liu Guandong on May 2, 1993, as the Auxiliary Bishop of Baoding diocese.  He was arrested on October 8, 1997, by the Chinese government, along with Su Zhi-Ming, since professing loyalty to the pope in Rome over loyalty to the Chinese state is forbidden in China. According to reports he was released on August 24, 2006. He was appointed Coadjutor Bishop in 2007.  Bishop He joined the government-sanctioned Chinese Catholic Patriotic Association, which split the diocese further between the underground and open communities. With the consent of the government, He was installed as the bishop of the Diocese of Baoding on 7 August 2010 to lead the “Open” community.

References

External links and additional sources
 
 

1949 births
Living people
21st-century Roman Catholic bishops in China
20th-century Roman Catholic bishops in China